"Major Minus" is a song by British rock band Coldplay. It was produced by Markus Dravs, Daniel Green and Rik Simpson, being the eighth track from the band's fifth studio album Mylo Xyloto (2011). The song takes its title from a fictional character of the same name created by the band, who is based on a collection of various media oligarchs and politicians.

Recording
The song was recorded by aLEca in the Beehive, the band's personal recording studio in London. It was one of the first songs from Mylo Xyloto to be recorded, having been primarily recorded in 2008, with the final touches being added in early 2010.

Development
According to excerpts from the band's personal notes contained within the limited, pop-up edition of the album, the song was originally titled "Silencia". The lead singer of the band, Chris Martin said that the song was inspired by Cormac McCarthy's book The Road. In an interview with the band by the American publication Billboard, Martin described the song as "a sort of villainous, dark piece", adding that "It's the idea of two people running away from a Kafka environment, or an Orwellian thing". Other sources of inspiration for the song include the 1970s and 80s graffiti movement of New York City and the White Rose movement. According to Martin, he admires people who speak out and express themselves in negative environments, admitting he's not always done that himself:

Release
The song was first released on 23 June 2011, as the b-side to "Every Teardrop Is a Waterfall". It was then re-released with the companion track "Moving to Mars" on the Every Teardrop Is a Waterfall EP on 27 June 2011. Finally, it was released as part of the band's fifth album Mylo Xyloto on 24 October 2011.

Reception
In a cover story run by American magazine Billboard on Mylo Xyloto, Coldplay described "Major Minus" as "an ominous, thundering beast of a song with rattling guitars, potent (and rare) Buckland solos and restless, shifting musical patterns". In an article published by Q on 10 October 2011 entitled "First Impressions of... Coldplay's Mylo Xyloto", they wrote:

Live performances
Coldplay first performed "Major Minus" at a friends and family gig at The Forum, Kentish Town, London on 31 May 2011. They then continued to play it throughout the 2011 Summer Festival Tour, playing it in front of the general public for the first time at Rock im Park Festival in Nürnberg, Germany on 3 June 2011, and playing it again at Rock am Ring the following day, which was the first live broadcast of the song officially authorised by the band and management. During Coldplay's headlining performance on the Pyramid Stage at Glastonbury Festival on 25 June 2011, the hashtag #MajorMinus trended on Twitter worldwide after the song had been played.

Charts

References

External links
 Coldplay official website
 Wikicoldplay entry

2011 songs
Coldplay songs
Song recordings produced by Markus Dravs
Song recordings produced by Rik Simpson
Songs written by Chris Martin
Songs written by Jonny Buckland
Songs written by Guy Berryman
Songs written by Will Champion